The 2020 NAB AFL Women's Rising Star award was presented to the player adjudged the best young player during the 2020 AFL Women's season. Isabel Huntington of the Western Bulldogs won the award with 33 votes.

Eligibility
Every round, two nominations will be given to standout young players who performed well during that particular round. To be eligible for nomination, players must have been under 21 years of age on 1 January 2020, not have been suspended during the season and never previously been nominated.

Nominations

Final voting

References

2020 AFL Women's season